Song Si-woo (born 28 August 1993) is a South Korean footballer who plays for Incheon United.

References

External links 
 

1993 births
Living people
South Korean footballers
K League 1 players
Incheon United FC players
Gimcheon Sangmu FC players
Association football midfielders